The Follies of 1907  is a 1907 musical revue which was conceived and produced by Florenz Ziegfeld Jr. The first of several theatrical revues that are collectively known as the "Ziegfeld Follies", the work contained songs material written by a variety of individuals; including music by Seymour Furth, E. Ray Goetz, Gus Edwards, Billy Gaston, Jean Schwartz, Silvio Hein, Matt Woodward and Gertrude Hoffman; and lyrics by Vincent Bryan, Edgar Selden, Will D. Cobb, Billy Gaston, William Jerome, Matt Woodward, Martin Brown and Paul West. Harry B. Smith authored the words for the comedic and dramatic sketches used in-between the musical numbers; as well as serving as head lyricist. Herbert Gresham staged the production and Max Hoffman, Sr. served as the musical director.

The Follies of 1907 premiered at the Savoy Theatre in Atlantic City, New Jersey on July 3, 1907, for tryout performances prior to its presentation on Broadway. The production included many well known entertainers from vaudeville, including singer Emma Carus, actresses Grace La Rue and Lillian Lee, actor Charley Ross, comediennes Florence Tempest and Harry Watson Jr., dancer Mademoiselle Dazie, and the entire troupe of chorus girls from Anna Held's touring company among other entertainers. The work premiered on Broadway at the Jardin de Paris on July 8, 1907.

References

External links 
The Follies of 1907 at IBDB

1907 musicals
Revues
Broadway musicals
Ziegfeld Follies